Prince George Transit System, or PG Transit, is the main public transit provider in Prince George, British Columbia. PG Transit is funded in conjunction with the City of Prince George and BC Transit (The provincial Crown corporation responsible for transit services outside Greater Vancouver), and operated by Prince George Transit Ltd., a subsidiary of Pacific Western Transportation.

Bus service

Routes

Frequency
Routes 1, 5, 11, 46, 47, 55 run hourly when University is in Every 30 mins at peak times ; Routes 15 runs every 15min at peak times and every 30 mins on weekdays and hourly on weekends 16, 88, and 89 run every 30 mins on weekdays and every hour on weekends ; Routes 17 and 18 are Peak Hour, Peak Direction Only when university in session sept to April ; Routes 12, 96 and 97 are limited service only when school is in. route 91 runs hourly 7 days a week

Fares
Adult fares cost $2.50, Seniors/Students $2.00 and Children under 4 travel free. Day Passes are $6.25 ($5.25 Seniors/Students) There are also monthly passes for $57.50 ($48 for Seniors/Students) plus a 4-month semester pass for High School students for $125. U-Pass At UNBC and CNC are $54.00 a semester, included in Student Fees.

Paratransit
handyDART is a dial-a-ride service for people with a disability that is sufficiently severe that they are unable to use regular transit buses without assistance. Clients must be pre-registered to make use of this service. operated By Carefree Society

Equipment used
Dennis Dart SLF
Nova Bus LFS

References

Official Site
City of Prince George Transit Discussion Forum

Transit agencies in British Columbia
Transport in Prince George, British Columbia